Clason Prairie or Clason's Prairie was a former settlement in the Town of Beaver Dam, Wisconsin, United States, roughly four miles southeast of Beaver Dam. It was named after James Clason, a native of Connecticut who settled there in 1841 and died in 1848. The one-room Clason Prairie School was closed down in 1962, although the building was still standing as of 1977. The old Clason Prairie Cemetery is still extant, at  it is maintained by the town.

Notable people
Jesse Clason, physician and politician, was born in Clason Prairie.

References

Geography of Dodge County, Wisconsin
Ghost towns in Wisconsin